Joseph O'Neill or O'Neil may refer to:

 Joseph O'Neill (writer, born 1964), Irish-born novelist and author of Netherland
 Joseph O'Neill (writer, born 1886) (1886–1953), Irish novelist
 Joseph O'Neill (politician), Irish politician, member of the 14th Seanad
 Joseph P. O'Neill (born 1947), American Democratic Party strategist in Washington, D.C.
 Joe O'Neill (born 1982), English footballer
 Joseph H. O'Neil (1853–1935), U.S. Representative
 Joseph P. O'Neil (1863-1938), U.S. Army general
 Joseph T. O'Neill (1931-2022), American lawyer and politician

See also
 Joseph T. O'Neal (1881–1944), American politician; mayor of Louisville, Kentucky